FIDAE (Feria Internacional del Aire y del Espacio) is a biennial international Air Show held in Santiago, Chile. The first show, FIDA'80 was held in 1980. Since 1990 was renamed to its current name.

The most recent was FIDAE 2018, as FIDAE 2020 (planned for March 31 - April 5, 2020) was cancelled due to COVID-19 pandemic.

Editions

 FIDA'80: First edition, to celebrate the 50th anniversary Chilean Air Force
 FIDA'82
 FIDA'84
 FIDA'86
 FIDA'88
 FIDAE 1990
 FIDAE 1992
 FIDAE 1994
 FIDAE 1996
 FIDAE 1998
 FIDAE 2000
 FIDAE 2002
 FIDAE 2004
 FIDAE 2006
 FIDAE 2008
 FIDAE 2010
 FIDAE 2012
 FIDAE 2014
 FIDAE 2016
 FIDAE 2018 (Cancelled due to COVID-19 pandemic)
 FIDAE 2022

External links
Official website
FIDAE history

Air shows
Recurring events established in 1980
1980 establishments in Chile